Sing and Play is a 1998 Mandarin album by Beijing-based singer Faye Wong. It includes 10 tracks in Mandarin, with a bonus disc of 3 Cantonese tracks. It was released on 21 October 1998 in Japan.

The album title is usually translated as Sing and Play in English sources.
Others refer to the album as Song Tour (遊 can mean tour), Scenic Tour which was the name of Wong's 1998–1999 concert tour,
Love Life,
or Song Play.

Sing and Play was the first Chinese album recorded using HDCD techniques.

The album was noted for some of its ballads, in contrast to the pop songs which had provided most of Faye Wong's hits around that time. "Red Beans", "Face" and "Love Commandments" have been popular songs of the album.

As of February 1999, the album sold almost 2,500,000 copies, including imports. It was rereleased in Japan on 3 March 1999 with the bonus track, "Eyes on Me".

Track listing

Notes

Reception
The album debuted at number three, respectively, in Hong Kong on the week of 4 October and in Malaysia on the week of 13 October 1998. It peaked at number one in Malaysia on the week of 20 October 1998. It reached number two in Hong Kong on the week of 11 October 1998. Billboard Asia bureau chief, Steve McClure, placed it in number seven of his top ten list of 1999 Asian albums.

Certifications

References

1998 albums
EMI Records albums
Faye Wong albums
Mandopop albums